Gerd Anne Therése Hegnell (born 25 June 1935 in Helsingborg, Sweden) is a Swedish actress. Earlier she was married to Per Oscarsson. She received the "Carl Åkermark Scholarship" of the Swedish Academy in 1992. Hegnell educated at a "theatre school" at Gothenburg City Theatre 1953–56. During many years she was engaged at Folkteatern in Gothenburg where she performed many nice role presentations, among them Magnus Nilsson's Knäckebröd och hovmästarsås in 1988 and Carin Mannheimer's Rika barn leka bäst in 1995 (and in 1997, then in the film with the same name).

After that she finished at Folkteatern she has played nice women in plays at private theatres in Stockholm, among them Two into One at Chinateatern in 1998 and the musical Singin' in the Rain at Oscarsteatern in 2006. Another popular appearance was in Staffan Göthe's play Ett lysande elände at the Royal Dramatic Theatre.

Selected filmography
 2010 - Tusen gånger starkare
 2003 - Solbacken: Avd. E (TV)
 2002 - Rederiet (TV)
 2002 - Suxxess
 2001 - Känd från TV
 2000 - Hur som helst är han jävligt död
 1998 - När karusellerna sover (TV)
 1996 - Kalle Blomkvist – Mästerdetektiven lever farligt
 1996 - Juloratoriet
 1995 - En på miljonen
 1991 - Önskas
 1990 - Ebba och Didrik (TV)
 1990 - Kurt Olsson – filmen om mitt liv som mig själv
 1984 - Berget på månens baksida
 1982 - Polisen som vägrade svara (TV)
 1955 - Kärlek på turné

References

External links
 
 Sfi.se
 Stadsteatern.gotebporg.se

Living people
1935 births
Swedish actresses
People from Helsingborg